The Aalto Theatre (Aalto-Theater) is a performing arts venue in Essen, Germany, and is home to the city's opera company Aalto-Musiktheater and the ballet company Aalto Ballett. The  serve as the venue's orchestra. The theatre opened on 25 September 1988 with Richard Wagner's opera Die Meistersinger von Nürnberg and is mainly used for opera and ballet, but also for concerts and galas.

The design by the Finnish architect Alvar Aalto was the unanimous winner in a competition in 1959, but the building was begun only in 1983, seven years after Aalto's death. A feature of the auditorium's design is its asymmetrical layout and the indigo blue colour of the seats.

Conductor Wolf-Dieter Hauschild held the positions of both Intendant and Generalmusikdirektor in personal union from 1992 until 1997, followed by Stefan Soltesz from 1997 until 2013. Soltesz led the Essener Philharmoniker to the title Orchestra of the Year in 2003 and 2008 and the Aalto-Musiktheater to that of Opera House of the Year in 2008, following a survey of 50 critics by magazine Opernwelt.

He was succeeded as Intendant by Hein Mulders and as Generalmusikdirektor by Tomáš Netopil.

References

External links

  
 Image gallery 
 "Gesamtkonzept Theater – Das Aalto-Theater Essen" by Eckhard Gropp 
 Models, architectural drawings, bibliography 
 Aalto Theater, Essen on Architectuul

Alvar Aalto buildings
Buildings and structures in Essen
Opera houses in Germany
Ballet venues
Modernist architecture in Germany
Music venues completed in 1988
Theatres in Essen
Theatres completed in 1988